Jace Denmark-Gessel (born July 1, 2004) is an American racing driver. He currently competes in the 2023 USF Pro 2000 Championship for Pabst Racing. Denmark previously competed in the USF2000 Championship with Pabst Racing.

Career

U.S. F2000 National Championship 
On April 1, 2021, Pabst Racing announced that it had signed Denmark to drive in the U.S. F2000 National Championship. He got his first podium at Lucas Oil Indianpolis Raceway Park. Denmark finished 11th in the championship. 

Denmark would return to the series for the 2022 season again driving for Pabst Racing. He got his maiden win at the first race of the season at St. Petersberg after a crash with Myles Rowe and Thomas Nepveu promoted Denmark to the lead.

Racing record

Career summary 

* Season still in progress.

American open-wheel racing results

U.S. F2000 National Championship 
(key) (Races in bold indicate pole position) (Races in italics indicate fastest lap) (Races with * indicate most race laps led)

References 

2004 births
Living people
Racing drivers from Arizona
Racing drivers from Phoenix, Arizona
U.S. F2000 National Championship drivers

United States F4 Championship drivers